There have been seven baronetcies created for persons with the surname Watson, one in the Baronetage of England, one in the Baronetage of Great Britain and five in the Baronetage of the United Kingdom. One creation is extant as of 2016.

The Watson Baronetcy, of Rockingham Castle in the County of Northampton was created in the Baronetage of England on 23 June 1621. For more information on this creation, see the Marquess of Rockingham.

The Watson Baronetcy, of Fulmer in the County of Buckingham, was created in the Baronetage of Great Britain on 22 March 1760 for Charles Watson (1751–1844), son of Admiral Sir Charles Watson (1714–1757). The monumental inscription above his grave in the Parish Church of St Andrew's West Wratting, Cambridgeshire, reads: To the memory of Sir Charles Watson, Bart. (whose remains are deposited in a vault beneath) Born at Bradfield, Berkshire, May 29th. O.S. or June 9th. N.S. 1751; died at Wratting Park, in this parish, August 26th. 1844. He was created a baronet by His Majesty George the second, March 22nd. 1760, at the early age of 8 years, on account of the eminent services of his father Admiral Watson, who died at Calcutta, August 16th. 1757, in the 44th. year of his age, whilst in command of His Majesty’s Naval Forces in the East Indies; and to whose memory a monument is erected in Westminster Abbey. Also to the memory of Juliana, wife of Sir Charles Watson, Bart., third daughter of Sir Joseph Copley, Bart., of Sprotborough Yorkshire, and Bake Cornwall; who died May 24th. 1834, aged 72 years, and whose remains are deposited in the Church of St Mary-le-bone, London. The 1st Baronet inherited via his mother the lordship of the Devon manor of Combe Martin, which he sold before 1810. The title became extinct on the death of the fourth Baronet in 1904. Robert Godfrey Wolesley Bewicke-Copley, 5th Baron Cromwell, was the son of Selina Frances Bewicke-Copley, daughter of the third Baronet, one of the co-heirs of the title of Baron Cromwell, abeyant since 1497.

The Watson, later Kay Baronetcy, of East Sheen in the County of Surrey, was created in the Baronetage of the United Kingdom on 5 December 1803. For more information on this creation, see Kay baronets.

The Watson Baronetcy, of Henrietta Street, Cavendish Square, in the parish of St Marylebone in the County of Middlesex, was created in the Baronetage of the United Kingdom on 27 June 1866 for the physician Sir Thomas Watson, Bt. He was President of the Royal College of Physicians and Physician-in-Ordinary to Queen Victoria.

The Watson Baronetcy, of Earnock in the parish of Hamilton in the County of Lanark, was created in the Baronetage of the United Kingdom on 15 July 1895 for John Watson. The fourth Baronet assumed by deed poll his Christian name of Inglefield as an additional surname in 1945. This surname was also borne by the fifth Baronet who died in 2007. The sixth Baronet, Sir Simon Watson, was a member of the Executive Committee of the Standing Council of the Baronetage. The baronetcy became extinct on the death of the seventh baronet on 3 May 2016.

The Watson Baronetcy, of Sulhamstead in the parish of Sulhamstead Abbots in the County of Berkshire, was created in the Baronetage of the United Kingdom on 11 July 1912 for William George Watson. The title became extinct on the death of the second Baronet in 1983.

The Watson Baronetcy, of Newport in the County of Monmouth, was created in the Baronetage of the United Kingdom on 13 February 1918 for Thomas Edward Watson. The title became extinct on the death of the third Baronet in 1959.

Watson baronets, of (1623)
see the Marquess of Rockingham

Watson baronets, of Fulmer (1760)

Sir Charles Watson, 1st Baronet (1751–1844)
Sir Charles Wager Watson, 2nd Baronet (1800–1852)
Sir Charles Watson-Copley, 3rd Baronet (1828–1888)
Sir Walter Joseph Watson, 4th Baronet (1836–1904)

Watson, later Kay baronets, of East Sheen (1803)
see Kay Baronets

Watson baronets, of Henrietta Street (1866)

Sir Thomas Watson, 1st Baronet (1792–1882)
Sir Arthur Townley Watson, 2nd Baronet (1830–1907)
Sir Charles Rushworth Watson, 3rd Baronet (1865–1922)
Sir Thomas Aubrey Watson, 4th Baronet (1911–1941)
Sir James Andrew Watson, 5th Baronet (born 1937)

The heir apparent to the baronetcy is Ronald Victor Watson (born 1966), eldest son of the 5th Baronet.

Watson baronets, of Earnock (1895)

Sir John Watson, 1st Baronet (1819–1898)
Sir John Watson, 2nd Baronet (1860–1903)
Sir John Watson, 3rd Baronet (1898–1918)
Sir Derrick William Inglefield Inglefield-Watson, 4th Baronet (1901–1987)
Sir John Forbes Inglefield-Watson, 5th Baronet (1926–2007)
Sir Simon Conran Hamilton Watson, 6th Baronet (1939–2016)
Sir Julian Frank Somerled Watson, 7th Baronet (1931–2016)

Watson baronets, of Sulhamstead (1912)

Sir William George Watson, 1st Baronet (1861–1930)
Sir Norman James Watson, 2nd Baronet (1897–1983)

Watson baronets, of Newport (1918)
Sir Thomas Edward Watson, 1st Baronet (1851–1921)
Sir Wilfrid Hood Watson, 2nd Baronet (1875–1922)
Sir Geoffrey Lewin Watson, 3rd Baronet (1879–1959)

References
Official roll of the Baronetage 
Kidd, Charles, Williamson, David (editors). Debrett's Peerage and Baronetage (1990 edition). New York: St Martin's Press, 1990,

Footnotes

Baronetcies in the Baronetage of the United Kingdom
Extinct baronetcies in the Baronetage of England
Extinct baronetcies in the Baronetage of Great Britain
Extinct baronetcies in the Baronetage of the United Kingdom